The Battle of Bogesund was an important conflict in the campaign of Christian II to gain power over Sweden. In 1520, Christian's army of mercenaries had landed in Sweden, seeking to consolidate Christian's powers over Sweden within the Kalmar Union and to unseat the rebellious Swedish viceroy Sten Sture the Younger. On the ice of lake Åsunden near Bogesund, Christian's army led by Otte Krumpen was intercepted by a force led by Sten Sture.

Little is known of the details of the battle. At an early stage, a cannonball ricochetted off the ice, hitting Sten Sture in the leg and killing his horse. Deprived of their leadership, Sture's forces (mostly armed peasants) fell into disarray and fled. Sture himself retreated towards Stockholm, but died of his wounds on the ice of lake Mälaren on February 5.

The anti-union resistance was continued by Sture's widow Christina Gyllenstierna and ultimately Gustav Vasa.

See also
Stockholm Bloodbath
Christian II of Denmark
Gustav I of Sweden

 

Bogesund 1520
1520 in Sweden
Bogesund